Zuidbroek may refer to two places in the Netherlands:
 Zuidbroek, Groningen, in Menterwolde
 Zuidbroek, South Holland, in Bergambacht